The Copa do Brasil 1996 was the 8th staging of the Copa do Brasil.

The competition started on February 6, 1996, and concluded on June 16, 1996, with the second leg of the final, held at the Estádio Parque Antártica in São Paulo, in which Cruzeiro lifted the trophy for the second time after a 2-1 victory over Palmeiras.

Luizão, of Palmeiras, with 8 goals, was the competition's topscorer.

Format
The preliminary round was disputed by 16 clubs, while the first stage was disputed by 32 clubs, including the ones qualified from the preliminary stage. The competition was disputed in a knock-out format. In the preliminary stage and in the first round if the away team won the first leg with an advantage of at least two goals, the second leg was not played and the club automatically qualified to the next round. The following rounds were played over two legs and the away goals rule was used.

Competition stages

Preliminary round

|}

Knockout stages

Notes

References
 Copa do Brasil 1996 at RSSSF
 Copa do Brasil top scorers at Campeões do Futebol
 Copa do Brasil 1996 table at Bola na Área
Enciclopédia do Futebol Brasileiro, Volume 2 - Lance, Rio de Janeiro: Aretê Editorial S/A, 2001.

1996
1996 in Brazilian football
1996 domestic association football cups